The  is a rapid transit line in Tokyo and Chiba Prefecture, Japan, owned and operated by Tokyo Metro. Its name translates to "East-West Line". The line runs between Nakano in Nakano-ku, Tokyo and Nishi-Funabashi in Funabashi, Chiba Prefecture. The line carries an average of 1,642,378 passengers daily (2017), making it the busiest line on the Tokyo Metro network. On maps, diagrams and signboards, the Tōzai Line is shown using the color "sky blue" and its stations are given numbers using the letter "T".

Overview
The line runs through central Tokyo from east to west via Takadanobaba, Waseda, Ōtemachi, Nihombashi, Kiba and Urayasu. It was opened as a bypass route for the Chuo Rapid Line and the Sobu Line, which had been incredibly congested at the time. It is the only Tokyo Metro line to extend into Chiba Prefecture (although the Shinjuku Line operated by Toei also extends into Chiba Prefecture.)

The Tōzai Line features through services at both ends of the line.

Women-only cars were introduced on the line for use during morning rush hour on November 20th, 2006.

During the COVID-19 pandemic, peak ridership dropped from a rate of 199% in 2019 to 123% in 2020.

History

The Tōzai Line was planned by a review committee of the then Ministry of Transportation in 1962 and numbered Line 5. Its name literally means "East-West Line", and it was primarily planned to relieve traffic on the busy Sōbu Main Line as well as provide a straight crosstown connection through north-central Tokyo. Although this corridor is also served by the Tokyo Metropolitan Bureau of Transportation (Toei) Shinjuku Line and JR Keiyō Line, the Tōzai Line continues to operate beyond capacity due to its accessibility to other lines, as well as to growing condominium developments in eastern Tokyo.

The  to  section opened in 1964, and the remainder opened in stages until its completion in 1969. Through service with the then Japanese National Railways (today part of the JR Group) – a first for a Tokyo subway line – began in 1969 connecting the Chūō and Sōbu lines. This is a rare situation in Tokyo, as the only other subway line with through services onto JR lines is the Chiyoda Line.

The Tōyō Rapid Railway Line, effectively an eastward extension of the line, opened in 1996. It nevertheless remains a private entity to which the Tōzai lines offers through services.

Chronology
March 16, 1966: The line is extended at both ends. It now runs between Nakano and Takebashi.
April 28, 1966: Through service to the Chūō Line of JNR commences as far as Ogikubo.
October 1, 1966: Takebashi to Ōtemachi section opens.
September 14, 1967: Ōtemachi to Tōyōchō section opens.
March 29, 1969: Tōyōchō to Nishi-Funabashi section opens and Rapid service begins (non-stop between Tōyōchō and Nishi-Funabashi).
April 8, 1969: Through service on the Chūō Line is extended to Mitaka, and through service begins on the Sōbu line to Tsudanuma.
April 8, 1972: Through service on the Sōbu Line is withdrawn except during rush hours.
1975: Another type of Rapid service is introduced, calling at Urayasu between Tōyōchō and Nishi-Funabashi.
October 1, 1979: Nishi-Kasai station opens.
March 27, 1981: Minami-Gyōtoku station opens.
1986: Commuter Rapid service is introduced, running non-stop between Urayasu and Nishi-Funabashi. 
(April 1, 1987: JNR is privatised. The Chūō and Sōbu lines become the property of JR East.)
1996: The Rapid service that runs non-stop between Tōyōchō and Nishi-Funabashi ceases.
April 27, 1996: Tōyō Rapid Line opens between Nishi-Funabashi and Tōyō-Katsutadai. Through service begins.
January 22, 2000: Myōden station opens.
April 1, 2004: Teito Rapid Transit Authority (TRTA or Eidan) becomes Tokyo Metro.
November 20, 2006: Women-only cars are introduced during morning rush hours.

Services
The Tōzai Line was the first Tokyo Metro line on which express services run: two types of rapid trains skip some stations east of Toyocho. The Tokyo Metro Fukutoshin Line began services on June 14, 2008 and also features express services.

Through services to  via the JR East Chūō Line and  via the Tōyō Rapid Railway run all day. During the morning and evening peak periods, through services run to  via the JR East Sōbu Line.

Station list 
Local trains stop at every station. Rapid trains stop at stations marked "●" and do not stop at those marked "｜". Some weekday westbound trains do not stop at stations marked "↑".

Rolling stock

Present
Tōzai Line trains are 10-car formations of 20-meter-long cars, with four doors per side and longitudinal seating. The maximum operating speed is 100 km/h. Newer trains feature wide doors to allow for faster boarding times.
Tokyo Metro
05/05N series (since 1988)
07 series (since 2006) (transferred from Yūrakuchō Line)
15000 series (since 2010)
Tōyō Rapid Railway
2000 series (since 2004)
East Japan Railway Company (JR East)
E231-800 series (since 2003)

Past
Tokyo Metro
5000 series (from 1964 until 2007)
8000 series (from 1987 until 1988, temporary, built for Hanzōmon Line)
JR East
301 series (from 1966 until 2003)
103-1000 series (from 1989 until 2003)
103-1200 series (from 1971 until 2003)
Tōyō Rapid
1000 series (from 1996 until 2006)

Depots

Fukagawa Depot (深川検車区)
Gyōtoku Depot (深川検車区行徳分室)
Fukagawa Workshop (深川工場)

Notes

a. Crowding levels defined by the Ministry of Land, Infrastructure, Transport and Tourism:

100% — Commuters have enough personal space and are able to take a seat or stand while holding onto the straps or hand rails.
150% — Commuters have enough personal space to read a newspaper.
180% — Commuters must fold newspapers to read.
200% — Commuters are pressed against each other in each compartment but can still read small magazines.
250% — Commuters are pressed against each other, unable to move.

References

 Shaw, Dennis and Morioka, Hisashi, "Tokyo Subways", published 1992 by Hoikusha Publishing

External links
 Tokyo Metro website 

Lines of Tokyo Metro
Railway lines in Tokyo
Railway lines in Chiba Prefecture
Railway lines opened in 1964
1067 mm gauge railways in Japan